Philip John Havill (born 8 April 1937) is a New Zealand cricketer. He played in two first-class matches for Northern Districts in 1969/70.

A right-arm medium-pace bowler and left-handed lower-order batsman, Havill also played Hawke Cup cricket for Franklin. He was the first Franklin player to represent Northern Districts.

See also
 List of Northern Districts representative cricketers

References

External links
 

1937 births
Living people
Havill family
New Zealand cricketers
Northern Districts cricketers
Cricketers from Auckland